Sombrero Fallout: A Japanese Novel is Richard Brautigan's seventh novel, completed in 1975 it was published the following year.

Sombrero Fallout is a novel which follows two stories.  The first revolves around a humorist in San Francisco in 1972 trying to cope with the recent loss of his Japanese lover, which includes various dreams the ex-lover is having.  During a particular fit, the author becomes dissatisfied with a story he had just begun about a sombrero falling from the sky.  This story eventually takes on a life of its own, including a heroic cameo appearance by Norman Mailer.

Publication history
1976, US, Simon & Schuster, Pub date Sep 1976, Hardback
1977, UK, Jonathan Cape, Pub date Mar 1977, Hardback
1978, US, Simon & Schuster, Paperback
1978, UK, Macmillan, Pub date Nov 1978, Paperback
1987, UK, Arena/Arrow, Pub date 02 Apr 1987, Paperback
1998, UK, Rebel Inc, Pub date May 1998, Paperback
2001, UK, Rebel Inc, Pub date 02 Jun 2001
2012, UK, Canongate, Paperback

The 2012 Canongate edition includes an introduction by Jarvis Cocker who chose the book to accompany him on BBC Radio 4's Desert Island Discs in 2005.

References

External links
Entry on brautigan.net

1976 American novels
Novels by Richard Brautigan
Metafictional novels
Novels set in San Francisco
Novels about writers
Japanese-American culture in San Francisco
Fiction set in 1972